External rotation (or extorsion or lateral rotation) is an anatomical term of motion referring to rotation away from the center of the body. The external rotator muscles include:

Muscles
 of arm/humerus at shoulder
 Deltoid muscle
 Supraspinatus
 Infraspinatus
 Teres minor
 of thigh/femur at hip
 Gluteus maximus
 Lateral rotator group
 piriformis 
 gemellus superior 
 obturator internus 
 gemellus inferior 
 obturator externus
 quadratus femoris
 Sartorius
 of leg at knee
 Biceps femoris
 of eyeball (motion is also called "extorsion" or excyclotorsion)
 Inferior rectus muscle
 Inferior oblique muscle

See also
List of internal rotators of the human body

References

External links

Anatomical terms of motion